Armel Chabel Marial Ngendakumana (born May 20, 1996), professionally known as Masterland, is a Burundian record producer and recording artist.

Masterland moved to Ngozi in rock Bujumbura Kugasaka's Live band in 2010 but started to make a name for himself in 2012 by taking part in the Primusic contest, a project initiated by BRARUDI and aimed at discovering young talents where he was selected among the 6 finalists.

After Primusic, he embarked on a solo career with the release of his local hit singles such as "Fantastic, Ndakwubaha, Sinzohinduka, Ntundekure, Alima, ..."

He founded Master Music production, a record label company in Bujumbura, producing for various Burundian musicians. He has worked with prominent artists such as Best Life Music, Samantha, Mt Number One.

Discography

Production discography

Awards and nominations

Buja Music Awards

|-
| rowspan="1"|2019
|
|Artist of the Year
|
|-
|-
| rowspan="1"|2019
|Sabwe
|Song of the Year
|
|-
|-
| rowspan="1"|2019
|
|Best Performance
|
|-
|-
| rowspan="1"|2019
|
|Best Male Artist
|
|-
|-
| rowspan="1"|2019
|Nzobikora Featuring Fabelove
|Video of the Year
|
|-
|-
| rowspan="1"|2019
|
|Best Music Producer
|
|-

Buja FM

RFM Bujumbura

References

External links

1996 births
Living people
People from Muramvya Province
Burundian record producers